Callionymus planus, the Japanese darter dragonet, is a species of dragonet native to the shallow Pacific waters off of southern Japan and Taiwan.  This species grows to a length of  SL.

References 

P
Fish described in 1955